Tilenda is a village in Bachhrawan block of Rae Bareli district, Uttar Pradesh, India. As of 2011, its population is 2,414, in 475 households.

The 1961 census recorded Tilenda as comprising 11 hamlets, with a total population of 1,015 people (525 male and 490 female), in 226 households and 197 physical houses. The area of the village was given as 911 acres.

The 1981 census recorded Tilenda as having a population of 1,333 people, in 280 households, and having an area of 369.08 hectares.

References

Villages in Raebareli district